The 2011 Aegon Pro-Series Loughborough was a professional tennis tournament played on hard courts. It was the second edition of the tournament which was part of the 2011 ATP Challenger Tour and the 2011 ITF Women's Circuit. It took place in Loughborough, Great Britain between 7 and 13 November 2011.

ATP singles main-draw entrants

Seeds

 1 Rankings are as of October 31, 2011.

Other entrants
The following players received wildcards into the singles main draw:
  Daniel Evans
  Oliver Golding
  Joshua Goodall
  Alexander Ward

The following players received entry from the qualifying draw:
  Daniel Cox
  Joshua Milton
  Timo Nieminen
  Daniel Smethurst

WTA entrants

Seeds

 1 Rankings are as of October 31, 2011.

Other entrants
The following players received wildcards into the singles main draw:
  Katie Boulter
  Harriet Dart
  Emma Devine
  Eden Silva

The following players received entry from the qualifying draw:
  Alica Barnett
  Georgia Craven
  Kyria Dunford
  Aimee Gibson
  Valeria Podda
  Holly Richards
  Jade Schoelink
  Tiffany William

Champions

Men's singles

 Tobias Kamke def.  Flavio Cipolla, 6–2, 7–5

Women's singles

 Tara Moore def.  Myrtille Georges, 7–6(7–5), 5–7, 6–4

Men's doubles

 Jamie Delgado /  Jonathan Marray def.  Sam Barry /  Daniel Glancy, 6–2, 6–2

Women's doubles

 Tara Moore /  Francesca Stephenson def.  Malou Ejdesgaard /  Amanda Elliott, 3–6, 6–2, [10–3]

External links
ITF Search
ATP official site
ITF official site

Aegon Pro-Series Loughborough
Aegon Pro-Series Loughborough
Aegon Pro-Series Loughborough
2011 in English tennis